Malcolm Terel Butler (born March 2, 1990) is an American football cornerback who has played in the National Football League (NFL) for seven seasons. He played his first four seasons with the New England Patriots, who signed him as an undrafted free agent in 2014. Butler spent his next three seasons with the Tennessee Titans. After retiring ahead of the 2021 season, he returned to the Patriots the following year, but was released when he suffered a preseason injury.

A two-time Super Bowl winner and Pro Bowl selection during his Patriots tenure, Butler is best known for his goal line interception in the final seconds of Super Bowl XLIX. The interception, which prevented a go-ahead touchdown and effectively ensured the Patriots' victory, is regarded as one of the greatest plays in NFL history.

Early years
Butler was born in Vicksburg, Mississippi, and has four siblings. He graduated from Vicksburg High School in 2009. As a senior, he averaged five tackles per game. Despite only playing football in his freshman and senior years at Vicksburg, Butler earned a scholarship to Hinds Community College in Raymond, Mississippi. Butler also participated in track and field at Vicksburg, where he competed in sprints and jumps. He had personal bests of 12.07 seconds in the 100-meter dash, 1.83 meters (6'0") in the high jump, and 6.92 meters (22'8.5") in the long jump.

College career
In his 2009 freshman year at Hinds Community College, Butler recorded 22 tackles and one interception, but was kicked off the team after the fifth game of the season. He transferred to Alcorn State University before being invited back to Hinds Community College in 2011, and as a sophomore recorded 43 tackles, three interceptions, and 12 broken-up passes.

In 2012, Butler enrolled at the University of West Alabama, majoring in physical education. He started all 12 games that fall for the Division II Tigers. He finished the 2012 season with 49 tackles, 43 solo, five interceptions (including three in one game against West Georgia), and averaged a team-leading 29.8 yards per kickoff return. In 2013, Butler was named a Beyond Sports Network All-American after recording 45 tackles, two interceptions, and one blocked field goal, and averaging 27.9 yards on kickoff returns during the season. He played in the 2014 Medal of Honor Bowl, a postseason all-star game, registering a solo tackle and an interception.

Professional career

New England Patriots

2014 season
Butler received an invitation to attend the New England Patriots’ rookie minicamp. On May 19, 2014, the New England Patriots signed Butler to a three-year, $1.53 million contract after he impressed coaches with his performance during rookie minicamp. During training camp, Butler competed for a roster spot against Dax Swanson, Justin Green, and Jemea Thomas. Butler had an impressive preseason and earned a roster spot as the sixth cornerback on the Patriots’ depth chart. Head coach Bill Belichick named him the sixth cornerback, behind Darrelle Revis, Alfonzo Dennard, Logan Ryan, Kyle Arrington, and Brandon Browner.

Butler made his NFL debut in the season opener at the Miami Dolphins and made two solo tackles during their 20–33 loss. He was inactive for three games as a healthy scratch (Weeks 5–7) after Alfonzo Dennard returned from injury. On November 2, 2014, Butler collected a season-high four solo tackles and deflected a pass as the Patriots defeated the Denver Broncos 43–21 in Week 9. He was inactive for another two games (Weeks 12–13) as a healthy scratch. On December 14, 2014, Butler earned his first NFL start and recorded two combined tackles during a 41–13 victory against the Dolphins. In Week 17, he collected a season-high five combined tackles during a 17–9 loss against the Buffalo Bills. He finished his rookie season in 2014 with 15 combined tackles (14 solo) and three pass deflections in 11 games and one start.

The Patriots finished atop the AFC East with a 12–4 record and received a first-round bye. On January 10, 2015, Butler appeared in his first NFL playoff game as the Patriots defeated the Baltimore Ravens 35–31 in the AFC Divisional Round. The following week, he made one tackle as the Patriots defeated the Indianapolis Colts 45–7 during the AFC Championship Game.

Super Bowl XLIX
On February 1, 2015, Butler and the Patriots appeared in Super Bowl XLIX against the defending champion Seattle Seahawks and Butler began the game as the fifth cornerback on the Patriots’ depth chart. Butler entered the game in the third quarter at nickelback after Kyle Arrington struggled to cover Chris Matthews. At the point Butler was inserted in the line-up, Seattle had scored on four straight offensive possessions. Butler was assigned to cover Jermaine Kearse with Brandon Browner covering Chris Matthews. On a first down, Seattle handed off to Marshawn Lynch; Butler made the initial tackle and Lynch was held to two yards. On the next play, Russell Wilson completed a pass to Kearse, and Butler made the tackle, holding the Seahawks to a five-yard gain. On the third down with three yards, Wilson threw deep to Kearse and Butler broke up the pass, forcing Seattle to punt. Seattle did not score again.
 
With under a minute left in the fourth quarter, Butler continued to cover wide receiver Jermaine Kearse and deflected a 33-yard pass by Russell Wilson. The deflected ball landed on Kearse as he fell to the ground and allowed him to juggle the ball and to complete the reception in what was described as one of the greatest catches in Super Bowl history. After recognizing that Kearse had made the catch and was not down by contact, Butler pushed Kearse out of bounds at the five-yard line.

Two plays later, with 20 seconds remaining and the Seahawks in position to score on the Patriots' one-yard line, Butler intercepted a pass attempt to wide receiver Ricardo Lockette at the goal line, returning possession to the Patriots and maintaining the Patriots' 28–24 lead. Butler said that he had guessed correctly that Wilson would throw to Lockette, having read the Seahawks two-receiver stack formation. "From preparation, I remembered the formation they were in ... I just beat him to the route and made the play." Butler gave credit to Patriots defensive coordinator Matt Patricia for preparing players well for the game. The interception was the first of Butler's NFL career. It was the only interception of a pass attempt from the one-yard line during the 2014 NFL season, out of 109 such attempts.

New England Patriots quarterback Tom Brady, who received a 2015 Chevrolet Colorado as part of his Super Bowl XLIX MVP Award, said he planned to give the truck to Butler. At the request of Brady, Chevrolet awarded the truck directly to Butler.

2015 season
Following the departures of Darrelle Revis, Brandon Browner, and Kyle Arrington, Butler was promoted to a starting cornerback position at the start of the 2015 season. During Week 2, against the Buffalo Bills, Butler caught his first regular-season interception and returned it to the Bills 30-yard line. On November 15, Butler was matched up against New York Giants' Odell Beckham Jr., who made four catches for 104 yards and a touchdown on twelve targets. Butler made a strip of Beckham in the end zone when it looked like Beckham had secured possession of the football for a touchdown. The touchdown, which would have given the Giants the lead with 1:45 to play, was nullified by the officials and helped the Patriots hold the Giants to a field goal, after which Stephen Gostkowski kicked a 54-yard field goal for the Patriots to win with 1 second remaining. The next week, Butler held Buffalo Bills wide receiver Sammy Watkins to 39 yards on three catches. Overall, Butler led all Patriots in total snaps, and was the only Patriot defensive player to play more than 90 percent of defensive snaps in 2015. As a result of his high snap count and low salary, Butler received a performance-based pay bonus of $319,282.65, the highest of any Patriot in 2015 and the fifth-highest in the league.

On December 22, 2015, Butler was named to the 2016 Pro Bowl.

2016 season

In the season opener against the Arizona Cardinals on September 11, Butler broke up a potential touchdown pass to Michael Floyd in the fourth quarter. In Week 7, against the Pittsburgh Steelers, he notched his first interception, picking off a pass from backup quarterback Landry Jones intended for wide receiver Antonio Brown. In Week 11, against the San Francisco 49ers, Butler recorded his first career NFL sack against Colin Kaepernick. In Week 13, against the Los Angeles Rams, Butler intercepted rookie quarterback Jared Goff for his second interception of the season. Against the New York Jets in Week 16 on Christmas Eve, Butler had the first multi-interception game of his career: he picked off both Bryce Petty and Ryan Fitzpatrick and also recovered a fumble. Butler was named second-team All-Pro by Pro Football Focus and the Associated Press. On February 5, 2017, Butler won his second Super Bowl championship as the Patriots defeated the Atlanta Falcons in overtime by a score of 34–28 in Super Bowl LI. In the game, Butler had two total tackles.

Butler was ranked 99th by his fellow players on the NFL Top 100 Players of 2017.

2017 season
Set to be a restricted free agent, the Patriots gave Butler a first-round tender worth $3.91 million on March 7, 2017. On April 18, 2017, Butler officially signed his tender with the Patriots.

After the Patriots signed former Bills' cornerback Stephon Gilmore to a five-year $65 million contract, Butler was demoted to the No. 2 starting cornerback after sitting atop the depth chart the previous two seasons. He started 15 games, recording 60 tackles, 12 passes deflected, two interceptions, and three forced fumbles.

On January 21, 2018, the Patriots won the AFC Championship to advance to the Super Bowl for the third time in Butler's career. Butler and the Patriots lost Super Bowl LII to the Philadelphia Eagles, 41–33. Butler did not play any defensive snaps in the game, only coming in for a single play on special teams.

After the game, Patriots head coach Bill Belichick said his lack of playing time was a "coach's decision," not due to disciplinary issues. When asked about the benching, Butler stated "I don't know what it was. I guess I wasn't playing good or they didn't feel comfortable. I don't know. But I could have changed that game." By the following morning, reports claimed that Belichick acknowledged a "much longer discussion" could occur regarding Butler's absence on defense from the game. Patriots beat writer Kevin Duffy revealed that Butler was demoted in practice during the Wild Card round of the playoffs, during which the Patriots had a bye week. Later in the week, Butler released a statement regarding his benching for the game. It was also revealed that owner Robert Kraft was not informed ahead of time regarding Butler being benched.

Tennessee Titans

On March 15, 2018, Butler signed a five-year, $61 million contract with the Tennessee Titans with $30 million guaranteed, reuniting him with former Patriots teammate Logan Ryan.

2018 season
In the season-opener against the Miami Dolphins, Butler had his first interception of the season by picking off Ryan Tannehill in the third quarter in the end zone and returning the interception 34 yards.  The Titans lost by a score of 27–20. During a Week 4 26–23 overtime victory against the Philadelphia Eagles, Butler had his first sack of the season against Carson Wentz. Overall, Butler struggled mightily in the first half of the season, but he got better as the season progressed. During a Week 13 matchup against the New York Jets, Butler intercepted Josh McCown in the final seconds, thus sealing a 26–22 victory for the Titans. Three weeks later against the Washington Redskins, Butler scored his first NFL touchdown after he intercepted Josh Johnson and returned it 56 yards.

Butler finished his first season with the Titans with a career-high 69 tackles, 12 pass deflections, three interceptions, a sack, and a touchdown.

2019 season

During the season-opener against the Cleveland Browns, Butler intercepted Baker Mayfield and returned it for a 38-yard touchdown in the 43–13 road victory. During Week 8 against the Tampa Bay Buccaneers, Butler recorded his second interception of the season by picking off Jameis Winston in the 27–23 victory. In the next game against the Carolina Panthers, he suffered a broken wrist in the second quarter. The Titans lost on the road 20–30. Butler was placed on injured reserve on November 5, 2019. Without Butler, the Titans finished 9–7 for the fourth consecutive year and lost to the Kansas City Chiefs in the AFC Championship.

2020 season
In Week 5 against the Buffalo Bills, Butler recorded two interceptions off of passes thrown by Josh Allen during the 42–16 win. Butler got his third interception of the season by picking off Mike Glennon in a 31–10 Week 14 victory over the Jacksonville Jaguars. In Week 16 against the Green Bay Packers, Butler recorded his fourth interception of the season off a pass thrown by Aaron Rodgers during the 14–40 loss. He finished the 2020 season with 100 total tackles (86 solo), four interceptions, and 14 passes defended in 16 games and starts.

In the Wild Card Round of the playoffs against the Baltimore Ravens, Butler intercepted a pass thrown by Lamar Jackson during the 13–20 loss.

On March 10, 2021, the Titans released Butler.

Arizona Cardinals
On March 30, 2021, Butler signed a one-year contract with the Arizona Cardinals.

On August 31, 2021, Butler decided to retire due to personal reasons. The Cardinals placed Butler on the reserve/retired list on the same day. On February 18, 2022, the Cardinals formally released Butler.

New England Patriots (second stint)
Butler signed a two-year contract with the New England Patriots on March 24, 2022, coming out of retirement. He was placed on injured reserve on August 16, 2022. He was released on August 25, 2022.

The Miami Dolphins hosted Butler for a workout on October 25, 2022.

NFL career statistics

Regular season

Postseason

Film
In February 2017, The Hollywood Reporter published an article stating that the production company Narrative Capital had acquired the rights to the story of Butler and his agent Derek Simpson for a film tentatively titled The Secondary.

References

Further reading

External links

 West Alabama Tigers bio

1990 births
Living people
Alcorn State University alumni
American football cornerbacks
Hinds Community College alumni
Hinds Eagles football players
New England Patriots players
Players of American football from Mississippi
Sportspeople from Vicksburg, Mississippi
Tennessee Titans players
Unconferenced Pro Bowl players
University of West Alabama alumni
West Alabama Tigers football players
Arizona Cardinals players